Edward Lee Floyd (born June 25, 1937) is an American R&B and soul singer and songwriter, best known for his work on the Stax record label in the 1960s and 1970s, including the No. 1 R&B hit song "Knock on Wood".

Biography
Floyd was born in Montgomery, Alabama, and grew up in Detroit, Michigan. He founded The Falcons, which also featured Mack Rice. They were forerunners to future Detroit vocal groups such as The Temptations and The Four Tops. Their most successful songs included "You're So Fine" and later, when Wilson Pickett was recruited into the group as the lead singer, "I Found a Love". Pickett then embarked on a solo career, and The Falcons disbanded.

Floyd signed a contract with the Memphis-based Stax Records as a songwriter in 1965. He wrote a hit song, "Comfort Me", recorded by Carla Thomas. He then teamed with Stax's guitarist Steve Cropper to write songs for Wilson Pickett, now signed to Atlantic Records. Atlantic distributed Stax and Jerry Wexler brought Pickett from New York City to work with Booker T. & the MGs. The Pickett sessions were successful, yielding several pop and R&B hits, including the Floyd co-written "Ninety-Nine and a Half (Won't Do)" and "634-5789 (Soulsville, U.S.A.)".

In 1966, Floyd recorded a song initially written for Otis Redding. Wexler convinced Stax president Jim Stewart to release Floyd's version. The Steve Cropper-Eddie Floyd "Knock on Wood" launched Floyd's solo career, and has been covered by over a hundred different artists from David Bowie to Count Basie. Eventually, Redding would cut an R&B hit version of the song in 1967 as a duet with Carla Thomas. It became a disco hit for Amii Stewart in 1979.

Floyd was one of Stax's most consistent and versatile artists. He scored several more hits on his own, including "I've Never Found a Girl (To Love Me Like You Do)" and "Raise Your Hand", which was covered by both Janis Joplin and Bruce Springsteen.

The song "Big Bird" (featuring Booker T. Jones on organ and guitar, Al Jackson, Jr. on drums, and Donald "Duck" Dunn on bass) was written while Floyd waited in a London airport for a plane back to the United States for Otis Redding's funeral. 

Floyd's career did not keep him from being one of the label's most productive writers. Almost every Stax artist recorded Floyd material, often co-written with either Cropper or Jones, including Sam & Dave ("You Don't Know What You Mean to Me"), Rufus Thomas ("The Breakdown"), Otis Redding ("I Love You More Than Words Can Say"), and Johnnie Taylor's "Just the One (I've Been Looking For)". The latter played during the opening credits of director Harold Ramis's film Bedazzled.

In 1980, Floyd released material on the UK record label I-Spy Records, owned and created by the UK band Secret Affair. He joined old Stax collaborators Cropper and Dunn, and fronted The Blues Brothers Band on a series of world tours, and in 1998, Floyd and former Falcon Wilson Pickett appeared on screen dueting on "634-5789" in Blues Brothers 2000.

As well as singing with The Blues Brothers Band, Floyd has been the special guest with former Rolling Stone Bill Wyman's Rhythm Kings on several dates in the US and the UK.

In 2008, Floyd returned to Stax Records, which was owned by Concord Music Group since 2004. His first new album in six years, Eddie Loves You So, was released in July 2008.

In November 2012, Floyd was inducted into the Carolina Beach Music Hall of Fame as a Pioneer Award Recipient.

In December 2012, Floyd released a new album at Christmas time. Eddie also has a son, Anthony Floyd, who also sings with him. In 2016 he was inducted into the National Rhythm & Blues Hall of Fame 

Eddie Floyd was named to the Memphis Music Hall of Fame in 2018.

On 1 September 2017, age 80, Floyd performed live at the Royal Albert Hall BBC Proms with Jools Holland and his Rhythm & Blues Orchestra, in a tribute concert to 50 years of Stax Records synonymous with Southern soul music.

On February 28, 2020, Rock House Records released Eddie Floyd's 1979 recording "Guess It Wasn't Meant to Be".

Discography

Albums
 Knock on Wood – (1967) – Stax
 Looking Back – (1968) – Ember Records
 I've Never Found a Girl – (1969) – Stax
 Rare Stamps – (1969) – Stax
 You've Got to Have Eddie – (1969) – Stax
 California Girl – (1970) – Stax
 Down to Earth – (1971) – Stax
 Baby Lay Your Head Down – (1973) – Stax
 Soul Street – (1974) – Stax
 Experience – (1978) – Malaco Records
 Flashback – (1988) – Ichiban Records
 Red, White & Blues (The Blues Brothers Band) – (1992) – Turnstyle Records
 Gotta Make a Comeback – (1999) – Plane Records
 To the Bone – (2002) – Rock House Records
 Eddie Loves You So – (2008) – Stax
 At Christmas Time – (2012) – Stax
 Down by the Sea – (2013) – Stax

Singles

References

External links
  – official site
 
 Eddie Floyd interview by Pete Lewis, 'Blues & Soul' magazine, July 2011

1937 births
Living people
African-American male singers
American soul singers
American male singers
Songwriters from Alabama
Musicians from Montgomery, Alabama
Atlantic Records artists
Malaco Records artists
Stax Records artists
Bill Wyman's Rhythm Kings members
The Blues Brothers members
African-American songwriters
Concord Records artists
Bellaphon Records artists